Herbimycin is a benzoquinone ansamycin antibiotic that binds to Hsp90 (Heat Shock Protein 90) and alters its function. Hsp90 client proteins play important roles in the regulation of the cell cycle, cell growth, cell survival, apoptosis, angiogenesis and oncogenesis.

It was originally found by its herbicidal activity, and thus named. The most recent herbimycins to be discovered, herbimycins D-F, were isolated from a Streptomyces isolated from thermal vents associated with the Ruth Mullins coal fire in Appalachian Kentucky.

Synonyms
 Antibiotic Tan 420F
 Herbimycin A

Biological activity
Herbimycin induces the degradation of proteins that are need to be  mutated in tumor cells such as v-Src, Bcr-Abl and p53 preferentially over their normal cellular counterparts. This effect is mediated via Hsp90.

See also
 Geldanamycin
 Satoshi Ōmura

References

External links 
 Herbimycin A from  Center for Pharmaceutical Research and Innovation

Antibiotics
1,4-Benzoquinones
Carbamates
Lactams
Ethers
Ansamycins